Bahia Center (Arabic: الباهية سنتر), is a complex of 31-storey skyscrapers in Oran, Algeria. First of 31-floor tower houses a shopping mall and a 500-room hotel. It is the second tallest building in Oran, and the second tallest building in Algeria, Bahia Center Tower was designed by MobilArt.

References

External links
MobilArt site
Visit Oran

Buildings and structures in Oran
Residential buildings completed in 2008
Skyscrapers in Algeria
Skyscraper hotels
Retail buildings in Algeria
21st-century architecture in Algeria